The 2004–05 Cincinnati Bearcats men's basketball team represented University of Cincinnati as a member of Conference USA during the 2004–05 NCAA Division I men's basketball season. The head coach was Bob Huggins, serving in his 15th and final year at the school. The team finished third in the American division of the conference regular season standings and lost in the quarterfinals of the Conference USA tournament. Cincinnati received an at-large bid to the NCAA tournament as No. 7 seed in the Austin region. After an opening round win over No. 10 seed Iowa, Cincinnati was beaten in the second round by No. 2 seed Kentucky, 69–60. The Bearcats finished with a 25–8 record (12–4 C-USA).

Roster

Source

Schedule and results

|-
!colspan=12 style=|Regular Season 

|-
!colspan=12 style=|Conference USA Tournament 

|-
!colspan=12 style=|NCAA Tournament

Rankings

References

Cincinnati Bearcats men's basketball seasons
Cincinnati
Cincinnati
Cincin
Cincin